The 2nd Armored Division ("Hell on Wheels") was an armored division of the United States Army. The division played important roles during World War II in the invasions of Germany, North Africa, and Sicily and in the liberation of France, Belgium, and the Netherlands. During the Cold War, the division was primarily based at Fort Hood, Texas, and had a reinforced brigade forward stationed in Garlstedt, West Germany. After participation in the Persian Gulf War, the division was inactivated in 1995.

World War II
The 2nd Armored Division was formed at Fort Benning, Georgia on July 15, 1940, by reorganizing and redesignating the Provisional Tank Brigade (the 66th Infantry Regiment (Light Tanks), 67th Infantry Regiment (Medium Tanks), and 68th Infantry Regiment (Light Tanks)). It was originally commanded by Major General Charles L. Scott, with Colonel George S. Patton Jr. in charge of training. Scott was promoted to command the I Armored Corps in November of that year, which put Patton, now a brigadier general, in command of the division. The division, which in February 1942 passed over to the command of Major General Willis D. Crittenberger, served with the First, Seventh, and Ninth Armies throughout the war.

The 2nd Armored was organized as a "heavy" armored division meaning it contained two armored regiments; each regiment having two medium tank battalions and one light tank battalion, with each battalion consisting of three companies (18 tank companies total). Along with the 3rd Armored Division, it retained its organization throughout World War II–the 14 other U.S. armored divisions were reorganized as "light" armored divisions, having three tank battalions, each consisting of three medium tank companies and one light tank company (12 tank companies total). Both types had an infantry component of three mechanized battalions, although the heavy divisions maintained an "armored infantry regiment" organization.

The core units of the division were the 41st Armored Infantry Regiment, the 66th Armored Regiment, the 67th Armor Regiment, the 17th Armored Engineer Battalion, the 82nd Armored Reconnaissance Battalion, and the 142nd Armored Signal Company. The 82nd Armored Reconnaissance Battalion was known as the "eyes and ears" of the 2nd Armored Division.

The 2nd Armored Division had three artillery battalions: (the 14th, 78th, and 92nd). The division also had support units, including the 2nd Ordnance Maintenance Battalion, 2nd Supply Battalion, the 48th Armored Medical Battalion, and a band and military police platoon. The military police and band were tasked with headquarters defense of base operations under the banner of the 502d Adjutant General Company (502d AG).

Opened front in North Africa
Elements of the division were among the first U.S. military to engage in offensive ground combat operations in the European and Mediterranean theater during World War II. The 2nd Armored Division, now commanded by Major General Ernest N. Harmon, served in North Africa along with the 1st Armored Division. They were part of the Western Task Force of Operation Torch, which landed at Casablanca in French Morocco on November 8, 1942. The remainder of Torch's American component were the 1st, 3rd, 9th and 34th Infantry Divisions. However, the 2nd Armored Division did not see much action in North Africa and instead remained in French North Africa on garrison and training duties. In April 1943 Major General Harmon relinquished command of the division to Major General Hugh Joseph Gaffey. Training in amphibious operations began in preparation for an amphibious landing at Sicily.

Operation Husky

As the reserve force of the Western Task Force of Operation Husky, codename for the Allied invasion of Sicily, the division landed on July 10, 1943, in support of the 1st Infantry Division at the Battle of Gela. Afterwards, the division next went into action in the second landing at Licata, Sicily on July 21 following the 3rd Infantry Division's better-known earlier landing on July 10. The 2nd Armored, operating closely with paratroopers of the 82nd Airborne Division, then fought through to the Sicilian capital of Palermo. Along the way the 2nd Armored Division captured thousands of Italian prisoners of war (POWs). The fighting in Sicily came to an end on August 17, with the 2nd Armored Division having sustained relatively light casualties in the brief campaign, where it had gained its first Medal of Honor of World War II, belonging to Sergeant Gerry H. Kisters. During the campaign the division came under the command of the U.S. Seventh Army, under Lieutenant General George S. Patton, who had been a former commander of the division.

Soon afterwards the 2nd Armored Division was sent to England, in preparation for the Allied invasion of Normandy, and remained there until June 1944. In April the division received a new commander, Major General Edward H. Brooks, a decorated veteran of World War I, replacing Major General Gaffey.

Normandy invasion

The 2nd Armored Division landed at Omaha Beach in Normandy on June 9, 1944, three days after the initial Normandy landings, and operated in the Cotentin Peninsula, later forming the right flank of the Operation Cobra assault. The division encircled the 2nd SS Panzer Division Das Reich and the 17th SS Panzergrenadier Division Götz von Berlichingen around Roncey, and destroyed most of their armored equipment. At La Chapelle, a 2nd SS Panzer column was attacked at point blank range by 2nd Armored Division artillery. Over the course of two hours American artillery fired over 700 rounds into the column. The Germans suffered the loss of 50 dead, 60 wounded and 197 taken prisoner; material losses included over 260 German combat vehicles destroyed. Beyond the town, the 2nd Armored engaged another column, killing 1,150 German soldiers and destroying an additional 96 armored combat vehicles and trucks. The U.S. 2nd Armored Division destroyed 64 German tanks and 538 other German combat vehicles during Operation Cobra, while itself losing 49 tanks. The 2nd Armored Division inflicted over 7,370 casualties on the Germans, while suffering 914 casualties of their own. This is approximately an eightfold disparity. The 2nd Armored blunted Operation Lüttich, the German counterattack on Avranches, then raced across France with the rest of the First Army, reaching the Albert Canal in Belgium on September 8. On September 18 it crossed the German border near Sittard and took up defensive positions near Geilenkirchen. On October 3, the division, now commanded again by Major General Harmon, launched an attack on the Siegfried Line from Marienberg, broke through, crossed the Wurm River, seized the town of Puffendorf on November 16, and Barmen on November 28.

Rhine campaign

Members of the division received 9,369 individual awards, including two Medals of Honor, twenty-three Distinguished Service Crosses, and 2,302 Silver Stars as well as nearly 6,000 Purple Hearts; among those receiving the Silver Star were Edward H. Brooks, Hugh Armagio, Stan Aniol, Staff Sergeant John J. Henry, William L. Giblin, Neil J. Garrison, Morton Eustis, son of William Corcoran Eustis, and Sgt Kenneth J. White. The division was twice cited by the Belgian government and division soldiers for the next 50 years wore the fourragere of the Belgian Croix de Guerre.

Composition 
The division was composed of the following units:

 Headquarters Company
 Service Company
 Combat Command A
 Combat Command B
 Combat Command Reserve 
 66th Armored Regiment
 67th Armored Regiment
 41st Armored Infantry Regiment
 82nd Armored Reconnaissance Battalion
 17th Armored Engineer Battalion
 142nd Armored Signal Company
 2nd Armored Division Artillery
 14th Armored Field Artillery Battalion
 78th Armored Field Artillery Battalion
 92nd Armored Field Artillery Battalion
 2nd Armored Division Trains
 2nd Ordnance Maintenance Battalion
 Supply Battalion
 48th Armored Medical Battalion
 Military Police Platoon
 502nd Military Intelligence Company

Casualties
 Total battle casualties: 5,864
 Killed in action: 981
 Wounded in action: 4,557
 Missing in action: 60
 Prisoners of war: 266
 Days of battle: 443

Cold War and Vietnam service
After a brief period of occupation duty, the division returned to Fort Hood, Texas, in 1946 to retrain and rebuild. The 2nd Armored Division returned to West Germany to serve as part of 7th Army from 1951 to 1957, when it returned to III Corps, Fort Hood.

While stationed in Germany in 1952 with the 7th Army, the 2nd Armored Division was based at Stutttgart-Vaihingen under the command of General Williston Palmer. During this time, Palmer enlisted the help of a young Corporal Samuel Adler from within his ranks to organize the Seventh Army Symphony Orchestra. During the course of the next decade, the orchestra remained based with the 2nd Armored Division and the Seventh Army while supporting America's cultural diplomacy initiatives throughout Europe during the height of the Cold War.  
      
The 1/50 Infantry; 2/1 Cavalry; 1/40 Field Artillery; and 1/92 Field Artillery fought in the war in Vietnam, but not the division as a whole. The division included the "Fort Hood Three", a group of three enlisted men who refused to ship out when ordered to deploy to Vietnam in 1966.

The majority of the division would spend much of the next 35 years based at Fort Hood, and the division remained on active service during the Cold War. Its primary mission was to prepare to conduct heavy armored combat against Warsaw Pact forces in defense of NATO. The division formed a key component of the U.S. military's plan to move 'ten divisions in ten days" to Europe in the event of a Soviet threat to NATO. The division practiced this task numerous times during Exercise Reforger from 1967 to 1988. To build and maintain combat skills, the division's maneuver brigades deployed almost annually to the National Training Center to face an opposing force modeling Soviet military weapons and tactics.

However, with the end of the Cold War, the U.S. military began to draw down its combat units. The 2nd Armored Division was scheduled for inactivation in the spring of 1990.

2nd Armored Division (Forward)

In 1975, the 2nd Armored Division's third brigade forward deployed to West Germany and was assigned to NATO's Northern Army Group (NORTHAG). The brigade received additional aviation, engineer, military intelligence, medical, and logistics support units and was reflagged as the 2nd Armored Division (Forward). The unit's primary mission in case of conflict with the Warsaw Pact was to either secure airfields and staging areas for the deployment of III Corps from the United States, or to deploy directly to the Inter-German Border (IGB) and establish a blocking position as part of a NATO combat force.

From 1975 through 1978, the Brigade HQ was located at Grafenwöhr, along with the rotating armor and artillery battalions and the supporting engineer and cavalry units.  Two rotating infantry battalions were based at Hohenfels and Vilseck.  The six-month rotations continued until 1978, immediately before the move to permanent facilities in northern Germany.

2nd Armored Division (Forward) was based at a new military facility near the village of Garlstedt just north of the city of Bremen. The facilities cost nearly $140 million to construct, half of which was paid for by the Federal Republic of Germany. The brigade had approximately 3,500 soldiers and another approximately 2,500 family dependents and civilian employees. The German government constructed family housing in the nearby city of Osterholz-Scharmbeck. In addition to troop barracks, motor pools, an indoor firing range, repair and logistics facilities, and a local training area, facilities at Garlstedt included a troop medical clinic, post exchange, library, movie theater, and a combined officer/non-commissioned officer/enlisted club. The division's soldiers and family members received radio and TV broadcasts from The American Forces Network (AFN) – Europe via the AFN Bremerhaven affiliate station located in the nearby port city of Bremerhaven. In April 1986, a Burger King restaurant opened on the kaserne.

The brigade was officially designated as 2nd Armored Division (Forward) during ceremonies at Grafenwöhr, FRG on July 25, 1978. The Garlstedt facilities were officially turned over to the United States by the German government in October. At that time the Garlstedt kaserne (camp) was named after General Lucius D. Clay, revered by the German people for his role as the American military commander following World War II. His son, a retired U.S. Army major general, attended the ceremony.

The brigadier general in charge of 2nd Armored Division (Forward) had a unique command. In addition to command of the heavy brigade, he also functioned as the Commander, III Corps (Forward), headquartered in Maastricht, Netherlands, and as commander of all US Army forces in Northern Germany, including the military communities of Garlstedt and Bremerhaven. In the event of the deployment of III Corps and/or the 2nd Armored Division from the United States, the division commander would revert to his job as assistant division commander for operations of 2nd Armored Division. This contingency was practised during REFORGER exercises in 1980 and 1987. As a result of this varied and demanding job, command of the 2nd Armored Division (Forward) was considered a plum assignment for armor branch brigadier generals, on par with perhaps only the Berlin Brigade for high visibility and potential for advancement to higher rank. Brigadier generals who held the position included James E. Armstrong, George R. Stotser, Thomas H. Tait, William F. Streeter, John C. Heldstab, and Jerry R. Rutherford.

The brigade's subordinate combat units initially consisted of the 3d Battalion, 41st Infantry; 2d Battalion, 50th Infantry; 2d Battalion, 66th Armor (Iron Knights); 1st Battalion, 14th Field Artillery, and Troop C, 2d Squadron, 1st Cavalry. In October 1983, as part of the army's regimental alignment program, 2–50 Infantry was reflagged as 4–41 Infantry and 1–14 Field Artillery as 4-3 Field Artillery. Other brigade subordinate units eventually included the 498th Support Battalion, Company D, 17th Engineer Battalion, and the 588th Military Intelligence Company. The brigade also had a military police platoon and an aviation detachment. In 1986, under the army's COHORT unit manning and retention plan, 3–41st Infantry returned to Fort Hood and was replaced by 1–41st Infantry. In 1987, 4–41st Infantry returned to Fort Hood, Texas and was replaced by 3–66th Armor (Burt's Knights, named for Captain James M. Burt who was awarded the Medal of Honor as a company commander in the 66th Armored Regiment in the Battle of Aachen during World War II). Now an armor-heavy brigade, 2nd Armored Division (Forward) fielded 116 M-1A1 Abrams tanks and nearly 70 M2/3 Bradley Fighting Vehicles.

The brigade initially deployed to Germany with the M60A1 Patton tank and the M113 armored personnel carrier. 4–3rd Field Artillery had the M109 155 mm self-propelled howitzer. In 1984, 2–66th AR transitioned to the M1/IPM1/M1A1 Abrams main battle tank. In 1985, 3–41st IN and 4–41st IN transitioned to the M2 Bradley Fighting Vehicle; also, C/2-1 Cavalry was replaced by an air cavalry troop, D/2-1 Cavalry, armed with AH-1S Cobra attack helicopters.

The division participated in numerous major NATO training exercises, including "Trutzige Sachsen" (1985), "Crossed Swords" (1986) and the "Return of Forces to Germany" (REFORGER) (1980 and 1987). Division subordinate units used the NATO gunnery and maneuver ranges at the Bergen-Hohne Training Area for gunnery and maneuver training and each year the division as a whole deployed south to Grafenwöhr and Hohenfels (both in Bavaria) training areas for annual crew and unit gunnery and maneuver qualification. 2nd Armored Division (Forward) developed a reputation for excellence during these deployments, particularly in tank crew gunnery.

Tank companies from 2–66th, and later 3–66th, Armor competed in the bi-annual NATO tank gunnery competition, the Canadian Army Trophy, or "CAT," as part of the NORTHAG team. C Company, 2–66th first contested for the trophy in 1983. And while a West German tank platoon won the competition that year at Bergen Hohne, 2–66th surprised the competition by performing well with its old M60A1 tanks, which used optical rangefinder technology from the World War II era. This showed the value of local course knowledge over pure technology. C Company, 2–66th contested for the trophy again in 1985, and D Company, 2–66th was part of the NORTHAG team in 1987. In 1989 C Company, 3–66th Armor won the competition outright. Participation in "CAT" was a source of great pride among the tank crews of 2AD (FWD).

The division had a formal partnership with Panzergrenadierbrigade 32, a Federal Republic of Germany Bundeswehr mechanized infantry brigade headquartered in nearby Schwanewede. The division also had informal relationships with Dutch, Belgian, and British NORTHAG forces, often conducting joint training activities at Bergen Hohne.

Gulf War 
The invasion of Kuwait by Saddam Hussein in August 1990 caught the division in the midst of the post-Cold War drawdown of the U.S. Army. Secretary of Defense Richard Cheney had begun force reductions which meant the 2nd Brigade was in the middle of inactivating. Thus the 2nd Brigade could not be deployed as a whole. A unit of the 2nd Brigade, Battery "A", 92nd Field Artillery Regiment, was attached to the 10th Marine Regiment, and a couple of others were attached to the Division's 1st Brigade ("Tiger Brigade"). For some reason, the 1st Brigade during the Saudi Arabia deployment was known almost exclusively as the Tiger Brigade. The Tiger Brigade, commanded by Colonel John B. Sylvester, deployed to Saudi Arabia and provided heavy armor support for United States Marine Corps forces in their attack into Kuwait. The Tiger Brigade included two battalions of the 67th Armor Regiment, the 1st and 3rd, TF 3-41 Infantry and 1st Battalion, 3rd Field Artillery Regiment. It served at the Battle of Kuwait International Airport. The Tiger Brigade was credited with destroying or capturing 181 enemy tanks, 148 APCs, 40 artillery pieces, 27 AA emplacements, and 263 Iraqi soldiers killed with an additional 4,051 captured.

The division's 3rd brigade, based in Germany, deployed to Saudi Arabia in the fall of 1990 and acted as the third maneuver brigade of the 1st Infantry Division from Fort Riley, KS. One of the brigade's battalion task forces, Task Force 1-41 Infantry, was the first coalition force to breach the Saudi Arabian border on February 15, 1991, and conduct ground combat operations in Iraq engaging in direct and indirect fire fights with the enemy on February 17, 1991. It was involved in a six-hour battle to clear Iraq's initial defensive positions. Initially it was tasked with performing counter reconnaissance and reconnaissance missions against Iraqi reconnaissance units. The brigade served at the Battle of 73 Easting with the 1st Infantry Division (Mechanized) along with the 2nd Armored Cavalry Regiment. They were responsible for destroying the Iraqi 18th Mechanized and 9th Armored Brigades of the Republican Guard Tawakalna Mechanized Infantry Division and the Iraqi 26th Infantry Division. They played a key role in the destruction of the 12th Armored Division destroying no less than 80 combat vehicles. The brigade destroyed 60 Iraqi tanks and 35 infantry vehicles along the IPSA pipeline. This is known as the Battle of Norfolk. The division's 4-3 FA battalion played a large role in the destruction of 50 enemy tanks, 139 APCs, 30 air defense systems, 152 artillery pieces, 27 missile launchers, 108 mortars, and 548 wheeled vehicles, 61 trench lines and bunker positions, 92 dug in and open infantry targets, and 34 logistical sites during combat operations. 
Before the end of combat operations the 2nd Armored Division(Forward) would engage a total of 11 Iraqi divisions. By dawn of the third day of the ground campaign, the 2nd Armored Division (Forward) had a hand in the destruction of four Iraqi tank and mechanized brigades and two divisions. Between the cease-fire and the official end of the war in April 1991, 2nd Armored Division (Forward) took part in security operations to ensure peace in Kuwait. The division then redeployed to Saudi Arabia, where some of its soldiers established and ran three refugee camps near Raffia, Saudi Arabia. Division relief workers processed over 22,000 Iraqi refugees between April 15 and May 10. After turning the camps over to the Saudi Arabian government, the unit redeployed to Germany.

The division's attack helicopter battalion, 1st Battalion, 3rd Aviation Regiment, deployed from Fort Hood to Saudi Arabia in fall 1990 attached to and with support from the 1st Cavalry Division (also based at Ft. Hood). The battalion was equipped with McDonnell Douglas AH-64 Apache attack helicopters. The battalion participated in many air strikes along the border region during the air portion of the campaign. The unit provided covering missions when the ground forces advanced into Iraq. 1st Battalion, 3rd Aviation Regiment was pulled back into Saudi Arabia after the cease-fire, with two squads staging in Kuwait to provide refueling and rearming services for battalion aircraft if hostilities resumed. The unit returned to Fort Hood, Texas, in April 1991 and continued the inactivation that was interrupted when Iraq invaded Kuwait. The unit was inactivated on September 16, 1991, and the regimental flag transferred to sister unit 3rd Battalion, 3rd Aviation Regiment based in Germany. The unit was transferred as a whole to Fort Campbell, Kentucky, in August 1991 and became the 2nd Battalion of the 101st Aviation Regiment (part of the 101st Airborne Division).

Inactivation 
After the Gulf War the division went through a series of inactivations and reflaggings. Due to the restructuring of the U.S. Army after the end of the Cold War, the division was ordered off the active duty rolls, ending more than 50 years of continuous service. On return to Fort Hood in 1991, the Tiger Brigade and 1st Battalion of the 3rd Aviation Regiment, all that remained of the U.S.-based division, were reflagged as the 3d Brigade, 1st Cavalry Division, and the 2d Battalion, 101st Aviation Regiment respectively. On September 1, 1991, 2nd Armored Division (Forward), in Germany, officially became 2nd Armored Division after main elements of 2nd Armored Division at Fort Hood inactivated. Over the summer and fall of 1992, 2nd Armored Division was inactivated. Lucius D. Clay Kaserne was turned back over to the German government and was later to become home of the German Army Logistics and Supply School (Logistikschule der Bundeswehr) as well as the seat of General der Nachschubtruppe.

In December 1992, the 5th Infantry Division (Mechanized) at Fort Polk, Louisiana, was reflagged as the 2nd Armored Division. In 1993, the unit moved to Fort Hood. In December 1995, the 2nd Armored Division was again reflagged, this time as the 4th Infantry Division (Mechanized), stationed at Fort Carson, CO. This formally ended the 2nd Armored Division's 55-year history. Several units historically associated with the 2nd Armored Division, including battalions from the 66th Armored Regiment at Fort Hood, TX, the 41st Infantry Regiment at Fort Carson, Colorado, the 1st Armored Division at Fort Bliss, Texas, and the 172nd Infantry Brigade at Grafenwöhr, Germany (inactivated May 31, 2013).

Lucius D. Clay's name was later reused for Wiesbaden Army Airfield.

Though it was inactivated, the division was identified as the fourth highest priority inactive division in the United States Army Center of Military History's lineage scheme due to its numerous accolades and long history. All of the division's flags and heraldic items were moved to the National Infantry Museum at Fort Benning, Georgia following its inactivation. Should the U.S. Army decide to activate more divisions in the future, the center will most likely suggest the first new division be the 9th Infantry Division, the second be the 24th Infantry Division, the third be the 5th Infantry Division and the fourth be the 2nd Armored Division.

Commanders

In popular culture
The division has featured in:

Films
Fury – Follows an -E8 Sherman tank & crew of the 66th Armored Regiment, operating in support of the 30th Infantry Division, inside Germany, in April, 1945, in the final days of World War II.
Television
Band of Brothers – In the episode "Carentan" the division is featured at the Battle of Bloody Gulch
Video games
Brothers in Arms: Road to Hill 30 – The division is featured in the final level "No Better Spot To Die" at the Battle of Bloody Gulch

See also
 Rhino tank
17th Armored Engineer Battalion

References 

 Donald E. Houston, Hell on Wheels, (Presidio Press, 1977) 
 E. A. Trahan, A History of the Second United States Armored Division (1946)
 Steven J. Zaloga, "M1 Abrams VS T-72 Ural" (2009)
 Stephen A. Bourque and John W. Burdan, "The Road to Safwan" (2007)
 John B. Wilson, "Maneuver and Firepower: The Evolution of Divisions and Separate Brigades" U.S. Army Center of Military History (1998)
 2nd Armored Division "Hell on Wheels" by Steven Smith

 US Tank Battles in France 1944-45 by Steven Zaloga
 Panzer IV vs Sherman: France 1944 by Steven Zaloga
Desert Redleg: Artillery Warfare in the First Gulf War by Col. L. Scott Lingamfelter

Notes

Works cited

External links 

Contemporary unit
 2nd Armored Division page
 GlobalSecurity.org page on 2AD
 Army Order of Battle of 2AD in Order of Battle of the United States Army World War II  reproduced at the United States Army Center of Military History
 2nd Armored Division (Forward)
History
 Strengthening NATO: Stationing of the 2nd Armored Division (Forward) in Northern Germany
 Historical record operations of US 2nd Armored Division

 2nd Armored Division (Forward) as part of 1 (NL) Corps covering force, 1985–1989
 
 AFN Bremerhaven

02nd Armored Division, U.S.
Armored Division, U.S. 02nd
Military units and formations established in 1940
Military units and formations of the United States in the Gulf War
Military units and formations disestablished in 1995